Husby is a village on the island of Tomma in the municipality of Nesna in Nordland county, Norway.  It is located on the southwestern part of the island, along the Stilfjorden.  It is the location of the Husby Estate and the Husby Chapel.

Husby (and the island of Tomma) historically has been a part of Nesna, but it (temporarily) belonged to the municipality of Dønnes from 1 July 1888 until 1 January 1962 when it was reunited with Nesna.

Media gallery

References

Nesna
Villages in Nordland